Don Mills may refer to :

Locations
Don Mills, a Toronto neighbourhood
Don Mills (electoral district), a provincial electoral district, 1963–1999
Don Mills Collegiate Institute
Don Mills Middle School
Don Mills Road
Don Mills station, a TTC subway station

People
Don Mills (footballer), English footballer
Donald Mills, singer
Donald Mills (footballer) (1909–1945), Australian rules footballer
Don Harper Mills, president of American Academy of Forensic Sciences
Don Mills (basketball), American basketball player

Mills, Don